Cory Peak is a summit in the U.S. state of Nevada.

Cory Peak was named after James Manning Cory (1830-1897), a businessperson in the mining industry. Variant names are "Corey Peak", "Corys Peak", "Mount Corey", "Mount Hull".

References

Mountains of Mineral County, Nevada